Qi Guan (born 4 November 1985) is a Chinese Renju player. He won the Renju World Championships in 2015. Up to 2018, Qi Guan has won the Chinese National Renju Championship for 2 times and the Chinese National Team Renju Championship for one time.

References 

1985 births
Living people
Renju world champions
Chinese Renju players